Peñarroya-Pueblonuevo Club de Fútbol is a Spanish football team based in Peñarroya-Pueblonuevo, Córdoba, in the autonomous community of Andalusia. Founded in 1950, it plays in Regional Preferente de Córdoba, holding home matches at Estadio Municipal de Casas Blancas, with a 2,500-seat capacity.

Season to season

12 seasons in Tercera División

Notable former players
  Lucien Moutassie
  Biranna Diop
José Manuel Hernández Avalo, Piochi

References

External links
Official website
Lapreferente profile 

Football clubs in Andalusia
Association football clubs established in 1950
Divisiones Regionales de Fútbol clubs
1950 establishments in Spain